Dragon Blade: Wrath of Fire, known in Japan as simply , is a game for the Wii from Japanese developer Land Ho! publisher D3 Publisher. Dragon Blade follows a young adventurer named Dal who seeks six legendary pieces of the "Dragon Blade," each infused with the soul of different guardian dragons. In an attempt to build the ultimate weapon and vanquish evil, the young protagonist embarks on a quest to find and seal away each of the six dragons, taking their souls and abilities in the process.

Plot 
The plot revolves around Dal and his quest to recover the six pieces of the Dragon Blade and vanquish the evil dragons that pillage the land. He is accompanied by a mysterious red dragon named Valthorian whose soul is the source of the Dragon Blade's powers. The plot was written by Richard A. Knaak, writer of Dragonlance novels. On a side note, the plot is similar to Christopher Paolini's Inheritance Cycle, Richard Wagner's cycle of operas Ring of the Nibelung (Specifically its third part) and Lloyd Alexander's
Chronicles of Prydain series.

Dal is plagued by repeated dreams of himself wielding a fiery sword and being instructed by a voice on how to use it (serving as the game's tutorial). Once all the breakable objects have been incinerated, he awakens to find his fiancé. He tells her of his dream, and when he finishes, the village falls under attack from the monsters that serve the evil dragons. After instructing her to run and hide, he is drawn to a large stone by a disembodied voice. He is teleported to a hidden cavity deep underground, where the handle and hilt to the fiery blade from his dreams is located. He takes the blade, and the disembodied voice reveals itself as Valthorian, the fire dragon that took favor with mankind during a time of war and gave them the extra fighting strength to sway the victory to one side.

Angered by his actions, the other five dragons plotted against him, eventually corrupting the six people Valthorian trusted most. Believing Valthorian would eventually destroy them, the people launch an attack. Unable to hurt the people he once loved and trusted, Valthorian is slain and his soul sealed into different orbs, pieces of the Dragon Blade. One of the six men, however, regretted his assistance in the deed, and took away his piece and hid it. For generations, the family guarded the treasure, which was the handle and hilt, until it led to Dal, his last descendant.

After learning of this, Dal returns to the village, finding it burning. Angered and empowered, he approaches the monsters and proceeds to kill them. Eventually, he finds his dying fiancé, who shares her last words with him. Saddened by her death, he wanders into the area where the main leaders of the attack are residing. As it turns out, they had been searching for the Dragon Blade, which Dal now wields. Dal kills them, spends the rest of the day burying the dead. With everyone from his village gone, he sets out with the Dragon Blade, the piece containing Valthorian's mind, to slay the ones that destroyed his home and his love.

Passing through several lands, Dal regains portions of Valthorian's soul, which is won by slaying the five remaining corrupted men that Valthorian trusted. The arms, tail, wings and head of Valthorian are recovered, as  Dal slays each of the dragons. Upon reaching Vormanax, a great fight occurs, and in the end, Valthorian is revived and slays Vormanax, trapping his soul in the Dragon Blade to replace his own. After thanking Dal, Valthorian realizes that a darker, more sinister plot was intended all along, and that a force greater than Vormanax was responsible, ending the story on a cliffhanger that is likely to never be resolved, since the likelihood of a sequel is low.

The six dragons, in order of appearance, are
Valthorian - Fire Dragon
Jagira - Water Dragon
Skaroth - Ground Dragon
Mobrius - Poison evil Dragon
Norgiloth - Lightning Dragon
Vormanax - Darkness/Shadow Dragon

Gameplay 

The game is a Hack and slash game, mixed with Beat 'em up and RPG aspects, similar to God of War and Devil May Cry.

In the game, the Wii remote is used as the weapon held by the main character. At first, it is a sword that can only slash and defend, but as players advance, they gain more weapon transformations. Confirmed usable weapon modes are a dragon fist, two dragon fists, a dragon head, dragon wings and a dragon tail. There are twenty levels in the game, and five worlds (four levels per world). To fight, players can lock on to enemies and either shoot fire with the dragon head or do various close combat techniques depending on which weapon is being used.

Reception 

The game received "mixed" reviews according to the review aggregation website Metacritic.  In Japan, Famitsu gave it a score of one seven and three sixes for a total of 25 out of 40.

References

External links 
 

2007 video games
Action video games
Hack and slash games
D3 Publisher games
Video games about dragons
Video games developed in Japan
Wii games
Wii-only games
Single-player video games